Valasi Luapitofanua Toogamaga Tafito Selesele is a Samoan politician and Cabinet Minister. He is leader of the Samoa National Democratic Party.

Tafito was elected to the Fono as a candidate for the Samoan Democratic United Party in the 1996 Samoan general election. He was re-elected in 2001. In 2005 he was appointed party secretary. He lost his seat at the 2006 election.

In August 2020 Tafito was unanimously elected leader of the Samoa National Democratic Party (SNDP).  Shortly afterwards the SNDP agreed an electoral alliance with the FAST party, which would see them run a single joint candidate in each electorate for the April 2021 Samoan general election. In October 2020 he was nominated as a candidate for FAST. Preliminary results showed him winning his seat.

On 24 May 2021 he was appointed Minister of Health in the elected cabinet of Fiamē Naomi Mataʻafa. The appointment was disputed by the caretaker government. On 23 July 2021 the Court of Appeal ruled that the swearing-in ceremony was constitutional and binding, and that FAST had been the government since 24 May.

In August 2021 Valasi announced that the government was considering establishing an inquiry into the 2019 Samoa measles outbreak.

Notes

References

|-

|-

Living people
Members of the Legislative Assembly of Samoa
Samoan Democratic United Party politicians
Samoan National Development Party politicians
Faʻatuatua i le Atua Samoa ua Tasi politicians
Government ministers of Samoa
Health ministers of Samoa
Year of birth missing (living people)